Arthur Bernardes Ribas da Silva Filho born 15 May 1955) is a Brazilian professional football coach, currently in charge of Tapajós.

Honours
Sport Recife
 Campeonato Pernambucano: 1991

Al Wasl
 UAE Arabian Gulf League: 1996–97

Al Kuwait
 Kuwait Super Cup: 2010
 Kuwait Federation Cup: 2009–10

References

1955 births
Living people
Brazilian football managers
Campeonato Brasileiro Série A managers
Campeonato Brasileiro Série B managers
Expatriate football managers in Angola
Brazilian expatriate sportspeople in Angola
Brazilian expatriate sportspeople in South Korea
Expatriate football managers in Portugal
Expatriate football managers in Saudi Arabia
Expatriate football managers in South Korea
Expatriate football managers in the United Arab Emirates
Madureira Esporte Clube managers
América Futebol Clube (MG) managers
Clube Atlético Mineiro managers
Sport Club do Recife managers
América Futebol Clube (SP) managers
Fluminense FC managers
Goiás Esporte Clube managers
Marília Atlético Clube managers
Esporte Clube Bahia managers
Al-Riyadh SC managers
Al-Wasl F.C. managers
Dubai Club managers
Expatriate football managers in Peru
Club Alianza Lima managers
Al Shabab FC (Riyadh) managers
Botafogo de Futebol e Regatas managers
Clube Atlético Juventus managers
Jeju United FC managers
Expatriate football managers in Kuwait
Kuwait SC managers
America Football Club (RJ) managers
Duque de Caxias Futebol Clube managers
Fortaleza Esporte Clube managers
Club Athletico Paranaense managers
Gangwon FC managers
Sociedade Esportiva do Gama managers
Nacional Futebol Clube managers
Kuwait Premier League managers
Brazilian expatriate sportspeople in Kuwait
Brazilian expatriate sportspeople in the United Arab Emirates
Brazilian expatriate sportspeople in Saudi Arabia
Brazilian expatriate sportspeople in Portugal
Expatriate football managers in Thailand
Expatriate football managers in Syria